The common mudskipper (Periophthalmus kalolo) is a species of mudskipper native to marine and brackish waters of the Indo-Pacific from eastern Africa to Samoa.  This species can be found in mangrove forests where it spends most of its time out of the water.  This species can reach a length of  SL.
The common mudskipper can deal with the chronic temperatures of up to 37°C and a chronic low of 14°C. Larger individuals aggregate in exposed intertidal mudflats and tend to spend about 90% of their lifetime out of the water.

References 

common mudskipper
Fish of the Indian Ocean
common mudskipper
Taxa named by René Lesson